The NITI Aayog (abbreviation for National Institution for Transforming India) serves as the apex public policy think tank of the Government of India, and the nodal agency tasked with catalyzing economic development, and fostering cooperative federalism through the involvement of State Governments of India in the economic policy-making process using a bottom-up approach. Its initiatives include "15-year road map", "7-year vision, strategy, and action plan", AMRUT, Digital India, Atal Innovation Mission, Medical Education Reform, agriculture reforms (Model Land Leasing Law, Reforms of the Agricultural Produce Marketing Committee Act, Agricultural Marketing and Farmer Friendly Reforms Index for ranking states), Indices Measuring States’ Performance in Health, Education and Water Management, Sub-Group of Chief Ministers on Rationalization of Centrally Sponsored Schemes, Sub-Group of Chief Ministers on Swachh Bharat Abhiyan, Sub-Group of Chief Ministers on Skill Development, Task Forces on Agriculture and up of Poverty, and Transforming India Lecture Series.

It was established in 2015, by the NDA government, to replace the Planning Commission which followed a top-down model. The NITI Aayog council comprises all the state Chief Ministers, along with the Chief Ministers of Delhi and Puducherry,  Lieutenant Governors of all UTs, and a vice-chairman nominated by the Prime Minister. In addition, temporary members are selected from leading universities and research institutions. These members include a chief executive officer, four ex-official members, and three part-time members.

History

On 29 May 2014, the Independent Evaluation Office submitted an assessment report to Prime Minister Narendra Modi with the recommendation to replace the Planning Commission with a  "control commission." On 13 August 2014, the Union Cabinet scrapped the Planning Commission (India), to be replaced with a diluted version of the National Advisory Council (NAC) of India which was established by the upa government. On 1 January 2015, a Cabinet resolution was passed to replace the Planning Commission with the newly formed NITI Aayog (National Institution for Transforming India).  Union Government of India announced the formation of NITI Aayog on 1 January 2015. The first meeting of NITI Aayog was chaired by Narendra Modi on 8 February 2015.

Finance Minister Arun Jaitley made the following observation on the necessity of creating NITI Aayog, "The 65-year-old Planning Commission had become a redundant organisation. It was relevant in a command economy structure, but not any longer. India is a diversified country and its states are in various phases of economic development along with their own strengths and weaknesses. In this context, a ‘one size fits all’ approach to economic planning is obsolete. It cannot make India competitive in today's global economy."

NITI Lectures 
NITI Aayog has started a new initiative on the advice of Prime Minister Narendra Modi called NITI Lectures: Transforming India. The aim of this initiative is to invite globally reputed policy makers, experts, administrators to India to share their knowledge, expertise, experience in policy making and good governance with Indian counterparts. This initiative will be a series of lectures started with first lecture delivered by Deputy Prime Minister of Singapore Tharman Shanmugaratnam. He delivered lecture on subject called  "India and the Global Economy" at Vigyan Bhavan, New Delhi. The Prime Minister spoke about the idea behind this lecture series and stated that his vision for India is rapid transformation, not gradual evolution.

On 31 August 2017, NITI Aayog developed a State Statistics Handbook that consolidates key statistics across sectors for every Indian State/UT. While the State data on crucial indicators is currently fragmented across different sources, this handbook provides a one-stop database of important State statistics.

Initiatives

NITI Aayog has taken initiative on blockchain usages in e-governance and has conceptualized the tech stack as 'IndiaChain'. IndiaChain is the name given to Niti Aayog's ambitious project to develop a nationwide blockchain network. 
 The vision is to link IndiaChain with IndiaStack, the digital infrastructure that forms the backbone of the Aadhaar project. The NITI Aayog initiative on the blockchain system will enforce contracts quicker, prevent fraudulent transactions, and help farmers through the efficient disbursement of subsidies. This project is the first step to a larger system of record keeping and public good disbursement.
NITI Aayog is developing a job portal to connect employers with workers who have returned to their home states due to nationwide lockdown.

The NITI Aayog has developed a Rs 75,000 crore vision for the industrial development of Great Nicobar Islands in Andaman and Nicobar Islands. The plan entails the development of a transshipment terminal with a greenfield international airport, townships and solar and gas-based power plants, and has faced substantial backlash from indigenous Shompen and Nicobarese communities who fear displacement. The proposed plan is expected to impose significant ecological pressure on the island, its wildlife and its surroundings.

Other initiatives

Student Entrepreneurship Programme
The Student Entrepreneurship Programme (SEP) 1.0 was launched in 2019 while the SEP 2.0 launched in 2020 aimed to convert the grassroot innovations of Atal Tinkering Lab (ATL) students into end products. The SEP 2.0 which was launched in 2020 provided the opportunity to the students of ATL to work with Dell volunteers and to get mentor support, end user feedback, manufacturing support and launch support of their products in the market. The scheme would be launched and run by "Atal Innovation Mission" (AIM) under NITI Aayog in association with Dell technologies.

Free tech-driven learning programmes 
In September 2021, NITI Aayog in association with Byju's launched an initiative to provide free tech-driven learning programmes to engineering aspirants from 112 districts of the country.

Members 
The NITI Aayog comprises the following:
.
 A Governing Council composed of Chief Ministers of all the States and Union territories with Legislatures and lieutenant governors of Union Territories (except Delhi and Puducherry).
 Regional Councils composed of Chief Ministers of States and Lt. Governors of Union Territories in the region to address specific issues and contingencies impacting more than one state or a region.
 Full-time organizational framework composed of a Vice-Chairperson, four full-time members, two part-time members (from leading universities, research organizations and other relevant institutions in an ex-officio capacity), four ex-officio members of the Union Council of Ministers, a Chief Executive Officer (with the rank of Secretary to the Government of India) who looks after administration, and a secretariat.
 Experts and specialists in various fields.

With the Prime Minister as the Chairperson, presently NITI Aayog consists of:
 Vice Chairperson: Suman Bery
 Ex-Officio Members: Amit Shah, Rajnath Singh, Nirmala Sitaraman and Narendra Singh Tomar
 Special Invitees: Nitin Gadkari, Piyush Goyal, Virendra Kumar, Ashwini Vaishnaw and Rao Inderjit Singh
 Full-time Members: V. K. Saraswat (former DRDO Chief), Ramesh Chand (Agriculture Expert) and Dr. V. K. Paul (Public Health expert), Arvind Virmani ( Economist) 
 Chief Executive Officer (CEO): B V R Subramanyam
 Governing Council: All Chief Ministers of States (and Delhi and Puducherry), Lieutenant Governor of Andaman & Nicobar Islands, and Special Invites

References

External links
 
  
 Planning Commission of India

Modi administration initiatives
Government agencies of India
Economic planning in India
2015 establishments in Delhi
Think tanks based in India
Government agencies established in 2015